Ida Ljungqvist (born September 27, 1981) is a Tanzanian-Swedish model and the first African-born person to be selected as a Playboy Playmate of the Month and the 50th Playmate of the Year.

Career 

She was discovered by 2007 Playmate of the Year Sara Jean Underwood at a bebe store on Rodeo Drive in Beverly Hills, California.
She was named Playboy's Playmate of the Month for March 2008 and the 2009 Playmate of the Year. She is the first African-born and second Swedish model to be named a Playmate of the Year. She is also the first Playmate of the Year to publicly dedicate her title to philanthropic work through non-profit charities and organizations. Ljungqvist co-hosted the Playboy New Year's Eve Party 2009 in Miami, Florida alongside several other playmates.

Since being named Playmate of the Year, Ljungqvist has worked with Empowerment Works, a non-profit, global sustainability think-tank. Her work includes raising awareness about the organization and fundraising.

Personal life
Ljungqvist was born in Tanzania to a Tanzanian mother and a Swedish father. Due to her father's work for UNICEF, Ljungqvist traveled a great deal.  She speaks English, Swedish, and Swahili. Ljungqvist has a degree in fashion design and marketing, and plans to study economics.

In December 2007, Ljungqvist married Joshua R. Lang. Lang filed for divorce in September 2008. In November 2008, MSNBC reported a custody struggle between them over their pet Chihuahua.

References

External links

 
 

1981 births
Living people
2000s Playboy Playmates
Playboy Playmates of the Year
Swedish female models
Swedish people of Tanzanian descent
American people of Tanzanian descent
American people of Swedish descent
African-American female models
Tanzanian female models
Tanzanian entertainers
Tanzanian people of Swedish descent
African-American Playboy Playmates
20th-century Swedish women
21st-century African-American people
21st-century African-American women
20th-century African-American people
20th-century African-American women